The Way is a 2010 American-Spanish drama film directed, produced and written by Emilio Estevez and starring Martin Sheen, Deborah Kara Unger, James Nesbitt, and Yorick van Wageningen.  In it, Martin Sheen's character walks the Camino de Santiago, a traditional pilgrimage route in France and Spain.

Plot
Dr. Thomas Avery is an American ophthalmologist who goes to France following the death of his estranged adult son, Daniel, killed in the Pyrenees during a storm while walking the Camino de Santiago (the Way of St. James), a Christian pilgrimage route to the Cathedral of Santiago de Compostela in Galicia, Spain. Tom's purpose is initially to retrieve his son's body. However, in a combination of grief and homage to his son, Tom decides to walk the ancient spiritual trail where his son died, taking Daniel's ashes with him.

While walking the Camino, Tom meets other people, all looking for greater meaning in their lives. He reluctantly falls in with three other pilgrims in particular. Joost is an overweight man from Amsterdam who says he is walking the route to lose weight to get ready for his brother's wedding and also so that his wife will desire him again. He is a friendly extrovert who is the first to start walking with Tom. Sarah is a Canadian fleeing an abusive husband, who says she is walking the pilgrimage to quit smoking. Jack is an Irish travel writer who when younger had desires to be a great author like William Butler Yeats or James Joyce but never wrote the novel he dreamed of. He is the last to join the quartet and has been suffering from "writer's block". As the pilgrims travel the Camino, they occasionally meet and talk with other pilgrims—two Frenchmen, a young Italian and Father Frank, an elderly priest from New York. Tom occasionally has visions of Daniel alive and smiling among other people. Tom starts out the journey being cold to his fellow pilgrims, but over the course of their journey he eventually opens up to them.

On the pilgrimage, the group experiences challenges, such as when a young Romani steals Tom's backpack containing his son's ashes. Although the thief escapes, his father drags him back to Tom to return the pack, with embarrassed apologies and an offer in compensation to attend a Romani street party in the evening.

After the group arrives at Santiago de Compostela, Tom is ultimately accompanied to Muxía by the other three members. There, he scatters the remainder of Daniel's ashes in the Atlantic Ocean.

With Daniel's backpack on his back, Tom is shown happy setting out on another journey, this time in Morocco.

Cast
Martin Sheen as Thomas Avery
Deborah Kara Unger as Sarah Marie Sinclair
James Nesbitt as Jack Emerson Stanton
Yorick van Wageningen as Joost Michael de Witt
Emilio Estevez as Daniel Avery
Tchéky Karyo as Captain Henri Sébastien

Production

Development
The film was inspired by Emilio Estevez's son, Taylor.  The inspiration for the project happened in 2003.  Taylor, at the time 19 years old, and Sheen, whose TV series  The West Wing was on hiatus, traveled the pilgrimage route. Taylor, who served as an associate producer on the film, had driven the length of the Camino with his grandfather. On the way, he met the woman who would become his wife; thus, the Camino held special meaning for him. After the trip, a series of discussions started between Sheen and his son for a movie about the Camino de Santiago. Sheen originally suggested it be a low-budget documentary, but Estevez was not interested in such a small project, wanting instead a bigger experience.

Estevez also found inspiration in his vineyard, Casa Dumetz, where he wrote much of the dialogue for the film.  Exploring the themes of loss, community, and faith, he saw parallels with the characters of the film The Wizard of Oz (1939). The script took six months to get a first draft.

The story is also based on selected stories from Jack Hitt's book Off the Road: A Modern-Day Walk Down the Pilgrim's Route into Spain (1994).

Filming
Filming started on 21 September 2009 and took 40 days. The production company and actors walked between 300 and 350 kilometers during filming. Estevez had a very small crew and shot with available light; night-time sequences were filmed by candle and firelight. Considering the Camino is special to local people on the route, the filmmakers felt great pressure to get the details right.

According to a Christian Broadcasting Network interview, a key scene almost did not happen. With church leadership opposed to allowing the crew to shoot inside the famous cathedral in Santiago de Compostela, Estevez says he took a leap of faith and asked everyone on set to pray for access. "And it worked", claimed Sheen. The crew was given permission just 48 hours before they were scheduled to shoot the scenes, which they felt were critical to the film.

Casting
Sheen originally suggested Michael Douglas or Mel Gibson for the lead role, but Estevez had written the main character's role specifically for his father. Aside from the main actors, those seen on-screen are real pilgrims from all over the world. One episode in the film involves a group of actual Romani people from Burgos.

Release
The Way was marketed largely via a word-of-mouth campaign. "We don’t have a lot of money to do a big $40 million P. & A.", Estevez said, talking about his marketing print-and-advertising budget.

The Way premiered in September 2010 at the 2010 Toronto International Film Festival and was commercially released in Spain first, with its Spanish premiere on November 10, 2010. The Maltese premiere on February 28, 2011 benefited a tiny Maltese organization, the Pope John XXIII Peace Lab of Ħal Far, which provides shelter to asylum seekers. The shelter, established in 1971, had not sought the funding.

The film was released in the United Kingdom in May 2011 and in the United States in October 2011. Estevez and Sheen took a promotional bus tour in promotion of the film across the United States and through some parts of Canada. The film was released on DVD in February 2012.

The film was not theatrically released in France until September 2013.

Reception

Box office
The film took in $110,418 in its U.S. opening weekend; as of February 2012, it had made $4,430,765 (or $4,430,650) domestically (with its widest release in 283 U.S. theaters), and $7,451,541 internationally.

Ultimately, the theatrical performance reached a gross of $11,882,191 and the home market performance an additional gross of $8,127,751, thus the film reached a total gross of $20,009,942.

Critical reception
The film has received a "Certified Fresh" rating of 83% on the review aggregator website Rotten Tomatoes based on a sample of 100 reviews, with an average score of 6.6/10. The consensus description is: "It may be a little too deliberately paced for more impatient viewers, but The Way is a worthy effort from writer/director Emilio Estevez, balancing heartfelt emotion with clear-eyed drama that resists cheap sentiment." Metacritic, which uses a weighted average, assigned the film a score of 64 out of 100 based on 28 critics indicating "generally favorable reviews".

Peter Travers of Rolling Stone magazine gave the film three out of four stars, while Andrew Schenker of Slant Magazine gave it 1 out of 4 stars. Eric Kohn of Indiewire gave the film a "B+" rating, commenting that "Estevez's narrative is dominated by master shots of the landscape capturing Tom and his pals wandering through the wilderness and small villages, exploring ancient cathedrals and local traditions." Kirk Honeycutt of The Hollywood Reporter wrote a mixed review, stating: "Emilio Estevez's The Way is an earnest film, its heart always in the right place, but it's severely under dramatized." Sheri Linden of Los Angeles Times noted that The Way is more low-key, cohesive, and personal than Estevez's preceding film Bobby.

References

External links
 
 

2010 films
2010s adventure drama films
American adventure drama films
English-language Spanish films
Films directed by Emilio Estevez
Films about hiking
Camino de Santiago
Icon Productions films
Films scored by Tyler Bates
Fiction about pilgrimage
Spanish adventure drama films
2010 drama films
2010s English-language films
2010s American films